De La Salle Academy may refer to:

 De La Salle Academy, a secondary school in Liverpool, England which is now Dixons Croxteth Academy
 De La Salle Academy, a name associated with De La Salle College (Toronto)
 De La Salle Academy, a name associated with La Salle Academy

See also 
 La Sallian educational institutions
 De La Salle College (disambiguation)
 La Salle High School (disambiguation)
 De La Salle High School (disambiguation)
 De La Salle (disambiguation)
 La Salle (disambiguation)